Josh A. Webber is a Canadian, award-winning independent filmmaker, director, producer, and screenwriter. A graduate of the New York Film Academy in New York City (2009), he has pursued a career working on commercials, television programs, short and feature films.

His first short film, Batter Up (2009), won the Golden Honu Award for Best Family Short in the Big Island Film Festival and received awards in several North American Film Festivals including Best Family Film in the Palm Beach International Film Festival, and Best Canadian Film in the Young Cuts Film Festival.

Webber has written, directed and produced several feature films including A Broken Code (2012), There Is Many Like Us (2015), American Rackets (2017), Secrets of Deception (2017), and Never Heard (2017).

Webber has also worked as the Director of Photography and editor on several television programs and with corporate clients such as General Motors, Ford, McDonald's, DreamWorks, Warner Brothers, Budweiser, and Red Bull to produce promotional videos, documentaries, and commercials.

Filmography 

Television

 Ben Baller Show (2012–2013) (Season 1, 6 episodes; Season 2, 8 episodes) [Director of Photography]
 In Reverie (2012–2013) (11 episodes) [Director of Photography]
 Art of Punk (2013) (8 episodes) [Director of Photography]

Short Films

 Batter Up (2009) [Director, Producer, Writer, Editor]
 In His Shadow (2012) [Director of Photography]
 Bang (2013) [Director of Photography]
 White Wedding (2015) [Director, Producer, Director of Photography, Editor]
 Down the Scale (2015) [Director, Director of Photography, Editor]

Films 
 2012 A Broken Code - (Azienda) Director, Producer, Director of Photography, Editor
 2015 Newark Ave - Director, Director of Photography, Editor]
 2015 There Is Many Like Us (documentary film) - Director, Producer, Writer, Director of Photography, Editor 
 2017 Secrets of Deception -  Director, Producer, Writer, Editor
 2018 Never Heard - Producer
 2021 Born a champion - Producer
 2021 Issac - Producer, Director
 2021 American Rackets (In production) [Director, Producer, Director of Photography, Editor]

References

External links 
 

Canadian documentary film directors
Canadian documentary film producers
Canadian male screenwriters
21st-century Canadian screenwriters
21st-century Canadian male writers